Coxie is a Flemish surname. Notable people with this surname include:

 Jan Anthonie Coxie (c. 1660–1720), Flemish painter
 Jan Coxie (1629–1670), Flemish painter
 Michiel Coxie (1499–1592), Flemish painter
 Raphael Coxie (c. 1540–1616), Flemish painter

Coxie family